Conchita Montenegro (born Concepción Andrés Picado; September 11, 1911 – April 22, 2007) was a Spanish model, dancer, stage and screen actress. She was educated in a convent in Madrid.

Multitalented
Montenegro first worked professionally as a model for the famous painter Ignacio Zuloaga y Zabaleta. During her childhood, she learned classical and Spanish dance. She was credited with revolutionizing the presentation of Spanish dances. Montenegro turned from dancing to dramatic acting and starred in numerous productions. She attained theatrical fame in Hollywood, France, and Germany by the time she was 13 years old. At the age of 16, she starred in the French film La Femme et le pantin (1928), directed by Jacques de Baroncelli.

Screen success

Montenegro came to Hollywood in June 1930 with a contract at Metro-Goldwyn-Mayer. She was 17 years old and could not speak English; however, in three months time, Montenegro became fluent enough to play the leading female part of Tamea Larrieau, Leslie Howard's love interest in the film Never the Twain Shall Meet (1931). Never the Twain Shall Meet is the English language version of a story written by Peter B. Kyne and was directed by W.S. Van Dyke.

Before this performance, Montenegro had been cast in special Spanish-language versions of MGM movies, such as Call of the Flesh and Love in Every Port (both 1930). The former starred Ramon Novarro, and the latter featured José Crespo.

Montenegro's next screen project was Strangers May Kiss (1931) starring Norma Shearer and Robert Montgomery, with Montenegro in the ingenue role as "Spanish Dancer." By mid-1931, Montenegro had left MGM and signed with Fox Film Corporation.

Train wreck
In August 1931, Montenegro was aboard the Southern Pacific Argonaut (passenger train) when the train derailed near Yuma, Arizona, two trainmen were killed in the crash. Luckily for Montenegro, she was riding in the second section along with actors Warner Baxter and Edmund Lowe. Forty others among the film company also riding in that section were spared injury when the second section missed hitting the first. The steam engine, two cars of the baggage car section, and a day coach overturned after the train struck a roadbed which had been softened by rain. The Argonaut was en route to a location shoot for The Cisco Kid (1931), in Tucson. Montenegro's character, "Carmencita," was the primary female role and source of strife between the Lowe and Baxter characters.

Fox starlet
In 1931, Fox Films selected three of its own stars in opposition to the thirteen actresses chosen as WAMPAS Baby Stars, sponsored by the Western Association of Motion Picture Advertisers. The three were Montenegro, Helen Mack, and Linda Watkins. Eleven Fox publicity men resigned in protest of the WAMPAS Baby Stars decision to eschew naming any Fox starlets among its list of actresses most likely to achieve success. In addition, Fox promised to name budding stars, or "Fox debutante stars", annually. 

Montenegro was sometimes featured in stage shows which coincided with the screening of film premieres. One such instance was the premiere of A Passport To Hell, starring Elissa Landi. The movie debuted at the Loew's Kings Theater in August 1932. Montenegro provided the vaudeville entertainment beforehand. On another occasion, she teamed with Teddy Joyce in the stage show for the opening of The Kennel Murder Case (1933). The film screened at the Warner Brothers Hollywood Theater. Together with Will Rogers, Montenegro performed an Adagio for Strings number prior to the premiere of Handy Andy (1934).

Montenegro's movie career in America continued until 1940. That year, she performed the leading female part in Eternal Melodies (Melodie eterne), an Italian production. The story focused on the unrequited first love of Wolfgang Amadeus Mozart, played by Gino Cervi. Playing Aloisa Weber, Montenegro jilts the composer in this Italian language production.

Private life

Montenegro applied for US citizenship in Chicago, Illinois, on March 16, 1932. She married a Brazilian actor, Raul Roulien, in Paris, France, on September 19, 1935. The couple toured South America and produced a motion picture called Jangada (1936). The film dealt with the customs of primitive peoples in South America. Another of Roulien's films, El grito de la juventud, which debuted in Buenos Aires, Argentina, on 24 September 1939, was much better known. A short time later Montenegro and Roulien were divorced. 

In 1944, Montenegro married the Spanish diplomat Ricardo Giménez Arnau, a senior member of the far right Falangist Party and Ambassador to the Holy See. 

Following a rare interview with Montenegro shortly before her death, Spanish author José Rey Ximena claims in his book, El Vuelo del Ibis [The Flight of the Ibis] that British actor Leslie Howard, with whom Montenegro had an affair after the pair starred together in Never the Twain Shall Meet (1931), used Montenegro to get close to Spanish leader Francisco Franco after being given the special mission by Winston Churchill to meet and urge Franco not to enter World War II on the side of the Axis powers. Montenegro claimed that she used her husband's influence to secure a meeting between the British actor and the caudillo while Howard was in Spain on a lecture tour to promote film in May, 1943, shortly before Howard lost his life when the civilian plane of which he was a passenger on a return flight to England was shot down by German Luftwaffe crashing into the Bay of Biscay. 

After filming several movies in Spain, the last of which was Lola Montes (1944), Montenegro retired from the cinema. She died in Madrid on April 22, 2007.

Selected filmography
 The Woman and the Puppet (1929)
 Strangers May Kiss (1931)
 Love in Every Port (1931)
 Never the Twain Shall Meet (1931)
 The Cisco Kid (1931)
 Forbidden Melody (1933)
 Parisian Life (1936)
 Lights of Paris (1938)
 Cristobal's Gold (1940)
 Eternal Melodies (1940)
 Idols (1943)
 Lola Montes (1944)

References

Bibliography
 "Films Please Spanish Star After Stage," The Gettysburg Times, Monday, November 14, 1932, Page 5.
 "Conchita Applauded," Los Angeles Times, July 11, 1931, Page A7.
 "Film Debutantes Make Bow In Row," Los Angeles Times, August 24, 1931, Page A1.
 "Talented Actress Stars On Screen," Los Angeles Times, August 19, 1932, Page A9.
 "Stage Star Conchita," Los Angeles Times, October 25, 1933, Page 11.
 "Musical Bill Now on View," Los Angeles Times, December 5, 1949, Page B9.

External links

 
 Photographs of Conchita Montenegro
 Bio and complete movies list

1911 births
2007 deaths
Spanish film actresses
Spanish silent film actresses
Spanish stage actresses
Spanish female dancers
Metro-Goldwyn-Mayer contract players
Spanish female models
20th-century Spanish singers
20th-century Spanish women singers